is a railway station in Ōta, Tokyo, Japan. It is the
southernmost railway station of Tokyo's special ward area.

Lines
Keikyu
Main Line

Layout
This elevated station consists of two side platforms serving two tracks.

History 
Keikyu introduced station numbering to its stations on 21 October 2010; Rokugōdote Station was assigned station number KK19.

References 

Railway stations in Japan opened in 1906
Railway stations in Tokyo